Rock am Ring 2006 is a promo DVD by Welsh metalcore band Bullet for My Valentine. It was filmed in 2006 at the Rock am Ring festival 2006 in Germany. They played only seven tracks.

Track listing
All songs written and composed by Bullet for My Valentine.
 "Her Voice Resides"
 "All These Things I Hate (Revolve Around Me)"
 "Cries in Vain"
 "Spit You Out"
 "Tears Don't Fall"
 "Room 409"
 "No Control"

Credits
 Matthew "Matt" Tuck - vocals, guitar
 Michael "Padge" Paget - guitar, backing vocals
 Jason "Jay" James - bass, backing vocals
 Michael "Moose" Thomas - drums

2006 video albums
Live video albums
Bullet for My Valentine albums
2006 live albums